Laurie Margolis (born 1950) is a BBC journalist and News Editor.

Career
On 2 April 1982 Margolis obtained information about the Argentinian invasion of the Falkland Islands using amateur radio and broke the news in the UK on BBC Radio 4 PM programme at 17:00 UK time.

Margolis (callsign G3UML) used a short-wave radio transceiver, connected to a large aerial on the roof of Langham Hotel office block in London, to establish radio contact with Bob McLeod (callsign VP8LP) in the Falklands Islands. The transcontinental SSB radio communication was made at 16:00 UK time on 21.205 MHz from the BBC's amateur radio club which was located in attic room 701 of Langham Hotel office block. Margolis recorded the conversation on an old-fashioned audio cassette.

On 28 December 2012, following the release of government files about the Falklands War by the National Archives in London under a 30-year rule, BBC TV broadcast this story again.

References

British male journalists
European amateur radio operators
Living people
1950 births
Amateur radio people